Boon Lay Bus Interchange is an air-conditioned bus interchange located in Jurong West Central, in the western part of Singapore. It is situated within Jurong Point and integrated with the nearby Boon Lay MRT station. This interchange serves a variety of passengers, including those from Nanyang Technological University, Jurong Industrial Estate and Tuas Industrial Estate. The interchange has been among the largest and busiest bus interchanges in Singapore, handling 31 services in the past until a few services were amended to the newer Joo Koon Bus Interchange in 2015.

History
Boon Lay Bus Interchange began operating on 1 July 1990 with services that used to terminate at the former Jurong Bus Interchange at Jurong Port Road and Jurong East Bus Interchange being re-routed to terminate there. That time, the Jurong West extension and Tuas Industrial area was still largely under development. As both areas are undergoing development, more bus services were introduced and by the early 2000s, there were about 30 bus services terminating at the interchange.

That time, there used to be an empty land beside the former interchange. In 2006, the land where the former interchange sits at and the land beside it was sold together as a 'White site' to Prime Point Development Pte. Ltd. and soon the land where the former interchange sits at was acquired to construct the Jurong Point Extension.

From 18 June 2006 to 26 December 2009, the interchange had it operations temporarily next to Boon Lay MRT station, at an empty plot of land surrounded by Boon Lay Way and Jurong West Street 64 while the bus interchange was being rebuilt as part of the Jurong Point extension project and this project consisted of the extension of Jurong Point (JP2), the new Boon Lay Bus Interchange and a 16-storey condominium that is known as 'The Centris'.

On 27 December 2009, the interchange moved back to its original location and all operations (except for bus Service 179, 179A and 199 which continued to operate at the temporary interchange till 7 May 2010) resumed at the re-constructed interchange located along Jurong West Central 3. Built over 20,000 square metres, it is Singapore's fourth air conditioned bus interchange and the first along the East West line. In total, it has 60 bus bays and 31 boarding/alighting wheelchair accessible berths with 22 of them being end-on and 9 of them being sawtooth (6 for boarding and 3 for alighting). Together with Boon Lay MRT station and Jurong Point, it is part of the Boon Lay Integrated Public Transport Hub.

With the opening of Joo Koon Bus Interchange on 21 November 2015, Services 182, 182M, 254, 255 and 257 were relocated to Joo Koon Bus Interchange. It reduced overcrowding at Boon Lay Bus Interchange. A further change was made on 18 June 2017 with the opening of Tuas West Extension, Services 256 and 258 were merged into service 258 and skipped the interchange.

Incidents
On 23 August 2017, a 17-year-old teenager proclaimed him terrorist with a bomb and repeatedly launching death comments including ranting with expletive-laden on the community. The teenager ran off after forming the crowd, and he was arrested two days later at Jurong Point in a police statement. The boy was later revealed to be Teo Zi Jian on a flickr post, a bus and train enthusiast and was diagnosed with autism.

Bus Contracting Model

Under the new bus contracting model, all the bus routes were split into 9 route packages. Bus Service 79 is under Bulim Bus Package, Bus Service 198 is under Bukit Merah Bus Package, Bus Service 30 is under Bedok Bus Package, Bus Services 172 and 180 are under Choa Chu Kang-Bukit Panjang Bus Package, Bus Services 178 and 187 are under Woodlands Bus Package, Bus Service 154 is under Serangoon-Eunos Bus Package, Bus Service 174 is under Clementi Bus Package, Bus Service 157 is under Bishan-Toa Payoh Bus Package and the rest of the bus services are under Jurong West Bus Package.

Currently, Bus Service 79 (Bulim Bus Package) is operated by Tower Transit Singapore. Bus Services 172 and 180 (Choa Chu Kang-Bukit Panjang Bus Package) as well as Bus Services 178 and 187 (Woodlands Bus Package) are currently operated by SMRT Buses. All remaining bus services are operated by the anchor operator, SBS Transit.

List of routes

References

External links
 Interchanges and Terminals (SBS Transit)
 Interchange/Terminal (SMRT Buses)

2009 establishments in Singapore
Bus stations in Singapore
Jurong West